Jang Eu-suk is a South Korean taekwondo practitioner. 

She won a gold medal in finweight at the 1987 World Taekwondo Championships in Barcelona, after defeating Rosa Moreno in the semifinal, and Mónica Torres in the final.

References

External links

Year of birth missing (living people)
Living people
South Korean female taekwondo practitioners
World Taekwondo Championships medalists
20th-century South Korean women